The German national cricket team is the men's team that represents the country of Germany in international cricket. The German Cricket Federation, which organises the team, has been an associate member of the International Cricket Council (ICC) since 1999, having previously been an affiliate member from 1991. The national team made its international debut against Denmark in 1989, playing as West Germany. It has since played regularly in European Cricket Championship tournaments, as well as twice in the lower divisions of the World Cricket League. In 2001, Germany also competed in the ICC Trophy (now the World Cup Qualifier) for the first and only time. In 2022, they played their first T20 World Cup Global Qualifier.

History

Germany became an affiliate member of the ICC in 1991. As West Germany, the country had played its first internationals in 1989, a two-match series against Denmark. The team made its international tournament debut in 1990, at the European Cricketer Cup in Guernsey. They hosted that tournament (which had been renamed the European Nations Cup) in 1996, playing against France, Portugal, and Sweden, and finished as runners up in the 1997 tournament after losing to France by one run in the final, the winning run being scored by David Bordes whilst he had a skull fracture. The Wisden Cricketers' Almanack later listed the final as one of the 100 best matches of the 20th century.

In 1998, Germany competed in the European Championship for the first time and finished seventh. They became an associate member of the ICC the following year and played in Division Two of the European Championship in 2000, finishing as runners-up to Gibraltar.

They played at the 2001 ICC Trophy in Canada, their first and, to date, only appearance in the ICC Trophy. They failed to progress beyond the first round and again finished as runners up to Gibraltar in Division Two of the European Championship the following year. They also played in Division Two in 2004, finishing third, and in 2006, again finishing third.

2018–Present
In April 2018, the ICC decided to grant full Twenty20 International (T20I) status to all its members. Therefore, all Twenty20 matches played between Germany and other ICC members after 1 January 2019 will be a full T20I.

In September 2018, Germany qualified from Group A of the 2018–19 ICC World Twenty20 Europe Qualifier to the Regional Finals of the tournament.

Germany played their first Twenty20 Internationals in May 2019, when they travelled to Brussels for three matches against Belgium, and then two matches against Italy in the Netherlands later the same month. These matches provided the team with some preparation ahead of the ICC World T20 European regional qualifier finals that were played in June 2019.

Tournament history

T20 World Cup Qualifier

2022: 7th place

World Cricket League

2008: 7th place (Division Five)
2010: 2nd place (Division Eight)
2011: 3rd place (Division Seven)
2013: 6th place (Division Seven)
2017: 5th place (Division Five)

ICC Trophy
1979 to 1990 inclusive: Not eligible – not an ICC member
1994: Not eligible – ICC affiliate member
1997: Not eligible – ICC affiliate member
2001: First round
2005: Did not qualify

European Championship
1996: Did not participate
1998:last place
2000: Division Two runners up
2002: Division Two runners up
2004: 3rd place (Division Two)
2006: 3rd place (Division Two)
2008: 5th place (Division Two)

Germany Tri-Nation Series

2021: Champions

Current squad

This lists all the players who have played for Germany in the past 12 months or has been part of the latest T20I squad. Updated as of 6 November 2022.

Records and Statistics 

International Match Summary — Germany
 
Last updated 6 November 2022

Twenty20 International 
 Germany's highest score: 180/3 v. Spain on 8 March 2020 at Desert Springs Cricket Ground, Almería.
 Highest individual score: 81* by Vijayshankar Chikkannaiah v. France on 7 August 2021 at Bayer Uerdingen Cricket Ground, Krefeld.  
 Best bowling figures in an innings: 4/5 by Ghulam Ahmadi v. Norway on 5 August 2021 at Bayer Uerdingen Cricket Ground, Krefeld.

Most T20I runs for Germany

Most T20I wickets for Germany

T20I record versus other nations

Records complete to T20I #1874. Last updated 6 November 2022.

See also 
 List of Germany Twenty20 International cricketers

References

External links
 Official site – in German.

Cricket in Germany
National cricket teams
Cricket
Germany in international cricket